Mellberg may refer to: 

 Bror Mellberg (1923–2004), Swedish footballer
 Olof Mellberg (born 1977), Swedish footballer

See also
 Mollberg, a surname